Janet Andrewartha (born 16 September 1951) is an Australian television and theatre actress. Andrewartha began her career as a music teacher before attending drama school. She graduated in 1979and began securing television and theatre roles. 

Andrewartha's most significant roles have been in Australian television series, most prominently Reb Kean in Prisoner and Lyn Scully in the soap opera Neighbours. 

Outside of television she has actively pursued her theatre career in the early 1980's and performing in the genre over four decades and has worked in numerous productions with the Melbourne Theatre Company and Playbox Theatre Company.

Biography
Andrewartha was born in Melbourne, Australia. In her early life, Andrewartha did not plan to become an actress and worked as a music teacher. While she worked in a high school, the principal asked Andrewartha to stage an end of year musical with her year 10 classes. She knew nothing about theatre and was asked to study to aid the production. Andrewartha took a part-time drama course and after one year decided to quit teaching to pursue acting full-time. She attended a three-year drama school course at the National Theatre in Melbourne. Andrewartha graduated from the National Theatre in 1979.

In 1981, Andrewartha toured her one-woman theatre show in Melbourne titled, Singing in the Raid. In 1982, she got to perform her show at the National Theatre. One of Andrewartha's earliest television roles was in a 1983 episode of Carson's Law. She also played Iris in the production Framework at the Universal Theatre, in Fitzroy. In 1984, Andrewartha joined the cast of the Network 10 drama series Prisoner, playing the character of Reb Kean. While starring in Prisoner, she took the role of Polly in the Victorian arts centre production of The Three-penny Opera. 

In 1985, she took roles in Russell Street Theatre productions. She acted in Barry Dickins' Reservoir by Night and in Shirley Gee's Never in My Lifetime opposite Kevin Harrington. Her Prisoner character Reb was written out of the series but Andrewartha reprised the role in June 1985.

Andrewartha continued working with the Melbourne Theatre Company on several productions, including a role in the Australian outing of Tom & Viv. For her portrayal of the role, Andrewartha won a leading actress accolade the 1987 Green Room Awards. In 1988, she took the role of Great Aunt Dinah in Tristram Shandy and Joan Dinkum Assorted.

In 1990, Andrewartha took the role of Marion Stewart in the ABC drama series Embassy. The character was portrayed as the strong wife of an Australian ambassador. For her portrayal of Marion, Andrewartha was nominated for the "Best Performance by an Actress in a Leading Role in a Television Drama" award at the 1991 Australian Film Institute Awards. Despite her success, Andrewartha was not asked to return for the show's last series and she resumed her work with the Melbourne Theatre Company. In 1991, she played Sandra in another Melbourne Theatre Company production, Sunday Lunch; she also took the lead role of investigative journalist Jean in Michael Gurr's Sex Diary of an Infidel. During the 1992 season, Andrewartha played the lead role of Emilia in Othello. In 1993, she took a role playing barmaid Breda in A Happy and Holy Occasion and later played Lisa in The Garden of Granddaughters. Andrewartha played Caroline in another play by Gurr, titled Underwear, Perfume and Crash Helmet, the play debuted in 1994. In the 1995 season she took the role of Mary Margaret in Good Works. Her 1997 theatre roles included a part in the Sydney Theatre Company collaboration Jerusalem and Isola in Navigating. In 1998, she secured the role in Hotel Sorrento and she later played Liz in Rising Fish Prayer. That year, Andrewartha also directed a theatre production titled Neon Angel.

In 1999, Andrewartha joined the cast of the soap opera Neighbours, playing the role of Lyn Scully. Andrewartha left the show in 2006. She immediately resumed working in theatre. In 2007, Andrewartha took a hiatus from acting while she helped care for her ill mother, until her death in January 2008. She also used the time off to help her daughter with her education. She later returned to Neighbours for a guest role in 2008 and once again in 2009 and remained with Neighbours for another two years. In 2011, Andrewartha decided to leave the series once again. She stated that she was only supposed to return in a guest role and ended up staying on. Andrewartha chose to leave to pursue other acting roles. The actress later reprised the role for further guest roles in 2016, 2017 and 2019.

In 2017, Andrewartha joined the cast of Seven Types of Ambiguity in the recurring role of Kathleen.

In 2023, her latest role is in the (SBS) drama miniseries Safe Home

Filmography

References

External links
 

1951 births
Living people
Australian film actresses
Australian soap opera actresses
20th-century Australian actresses
21st-century Australian actresses
Australian musical theatre actresses